Super Supau is a Taiwanese sports drink, manufactured by Vitalon Foods company since 1981. The company is based in the Gong Ye district of Taichung. The drink competes against Pocari Sweat and Aquarius, two brands introduced from Japan, as well as Heysong's Fin. Super Supau contains potassium, sodium, magnesium, calcium, electrolyte, vitamin C and Bifidobacterium. Super Supau is the best-selling sports drink brand in Taiwan.

See also 
 Sports Drink
 Aquarius 
 Pocari Sweat

References

External links 

 Otsuka's Pocari Sweat Site (Japanese and English)

Energy drinks
Soft drinks
Taiwanese drinks
Taiwanese brands
Products introduced in 1981
1981 establishments in Taiwan